Shakani is a Somali settlement in Lamu County, Kenya

References 

Populated places in North Eastern Province (Kenya)
Lamu County